Reverend Paula Stone Williams (born 1951) is an American pastoral counselor. She served as president of the Christian church planting organization Orchard Group from 1989 to 2009. Williams came out as a transgender woman in December 2012.

Williams was fired from Orchard Group and from the Christian Standard periodical, where she had worked as the editor. She now is a pastor at Left Hand Church in Longmont, Colorado. She has hosted several TED Talks, sometimes accompanied by her son, Jonathan Williams. She currently lives in Colorado. Her book, As a Woman, was published in 2021.

References 

1951 births
Living people
Women Christian clergy
LGBT Christian clergy
LGBT people from Colorado
Transgender women
Religious leaders from Colorado